The North Yorkshire and South Durham Cricket League, commonly abbreviated to NYSD, is the top level competition for recreational club cricket in the north of Yorkshire and south of Durham, England. The league was founded as long ago as 1892, the first competition was held in the following year. The league chose to play an official, if shortened, competition after most ECB Premier Leagues formally cancelled the 2020 season due the COVID-19 pandemic.

It is a successful league in the country, in national inter-league competitive cricket, having won the LCC National inter-league competition (latterly known as the Presidents Trophy) on no fewer than 12 occasions. The League hold the record for the longest sequence of consecutive titles (7 from 1988 to 1994) and the longest sequence of consecutive victories (36). Within that competition they hold the record for the highest total recorded (425-6 in 45 overs v the NEPL at Marske in 2010). In 2018 Richmondshire Cricket Club won the ECB National Club Championship.

League members
: Bedale, Great Ayton, Guisborough, Maltby, Marske, Marton, Middlesbrough , Normanby Hall, Northallerton, Redcar, Richmondshire, Saltburn, Stokesley, Thornaby, Whitby and Yarm
: Barnard Castle, Billingham Synthonia, Bishop Auckland, Blackhall, Darlington, Darlington Railway Athletic, Hartlepool, Newton Aycliffe, Norton, Preston, Rockliffe Park, Seaton Carew, Sedgefield, Shildon Railway, Stockton and Wolviston

Winners

Source:

Premier division since ECB Premier League status

References

External links
 Official play-cricket website

Cricket competitions in Yorkshire
ECB Premier Leagues
Cricket in County Durham
Cricket in North Yorkshire